Cléty is a commune in the Pas-de-Calais department in the Hauts-de-France region of France.

Geography
A small farming village situated 10 miles (16 km) south of Saint-Omer, at the D193 and D928 crossroads.

Population

Places of interest
 The church of St.Leger, dating from the seventeenth century.

See also
Communes of the Pas-de-Calais department

References

Communes of Pas-de-Calais